The 37th General Assembly of Prince Edward Island was in session from March 7, 1912, to August 21, 1915. The Conservative Party led by John Alexander Mathieson formed the government.

J. Edward Wyatt was elected speaker.

There were four sessions of the 37th General Assembly:

Members

Kings

Prince

Queens

Notes:

References
  Election results for the Prince Edward Island Legislative Assembly, 1912-01-03
 O'Handley, Kathryn Canadian Parliamentary Guide, 1994 

Terms of the General Assembly of Prince Edward Island
1912 establishments in Prince Edward Island
1915 disestablishments in Prince Edward Island